The Health Dynamics Inventory (HDI) is a 50 item self-report questionnaire developed to evaluate mental health functioning and change over time and treatment. The HDI was written to evaluate the three aspects of mental disorders as described in the Diagnostic and Statistical Manual of Mental Disorders (DSM): "clinically significant behavioral or psychological syndrome or pattern...associated with present distress...or disability". This also corresponds to the phase model described by Howard and colleagues Accordingly, the HDI assesses (1) the experience of emotional or behavioral symptoms that define mental illness, such as dysphoria, worry, angry outbursts, low self-esteem, or excessive drinking, (2) the level of emotional distress related to these symptoms, and (3) the impairment or problems fulfilling the major roles of one's life.

The HDI was developed for use with mental and behavioral health outpatient, day treatment, hospital, and chemical health programs for both children and adults. It has multiple applications for improving the mental health treatment of children and adults, including in primary care medicine and integrated care. It was designed to be responsive to treatment effects and has descriptive anchors on a 5 point scale to allow for discrimination of frequency and severity of symptom expression.

The HDI was developed for ease of use for patients, researchers, clinicians, and clinics.  It was designed to be easy to administer and to score, easy to complete, and to provide results that are easily understood and transformed into meaningful decisions, diagnoses and treatment plans.  Most importantly, the HDI was designed to allow clear comparison between multiple administrations, demonstrating the degree of effectiveness of the services provided to individuals throughout their treatment, and to other changes of condition.  This allows clinicians and patients to recognize their successes and failures, alert clinicians to high risk situations, target and modify treatment as necessary, and for clinics and clinic managers to track and monitor the process and progress of persons under their care.

Comparison to Other Instruments
The authors have used the criteria specified by Erbes,et al., to evaluate the HDI. Erbes, et al. considered the following criteria to evaluate outcomes measurement instruments:  reliability; validity; factor structure; sensitivity to change; scope of measurement; utility across patient populations; the potential to enhance critical decisions about clinical care; briefness; whether the instrument was self-report; ease of administration; ease of interpretation; reasonable price; applicability across multiple settings; computerization capability; computer scoring and comparison to standardization samples; and face validity (whether it makes sense to patients and clinicians).

Reliability
Erbes et al. noted that an acceptable range for test-retest reliability was greater than .70, whereas  internal consistency needed to be greater than .80. The HDI meets these criteria.
The HDI major scales (Distress, Global Symptoms and Global Impairment) and its subscales have been evaluated. Co-efficient Alpha and Gutman split half reliabilities are excellent.
HDI split half reliabilities values ranged from .70 for the Substance Abuse Subscale to .91 for the Depression Subscale
Alpha .reliabilities of 72 to .95 on all three major scales and all of the subscales.

Validity
Erbes et al. required construct and criterion-related validity, that is, that the instrument be correlated to other established instruments. The HDI meets these criteria.  The major scales (Distress, Global Symptoms and Global Impairment) distinguish patient and non-patient samples easily. Patients score significantly higher on all of the scales, as would be expected.

In the development of the HDI, the validity of the subscales (e.g., Depression, Anxiety, Substance Abuse and Psychotic Thinking) was evaluated by comparing patients with these diagnoses to other patients and to non-patients. The results supported the validity of the subscales. For example, patients with diagnoses of depression scored significantly higher on the Depression subscale than both patients without such a diagnosis and non-patients. The same was true for the other subscales.

In another demonstration of validity, analyses indicated that psychiatrist and therapist ratings of distress and impairment (as well as of diagnoses) were significantly correlated with patient reports of distress, symptoms and impairment.

Factor Structure
Erbes et al. considered the independence of factor structures as a third consideration for evaluating outcome measures. The HDI has been extensively tested for correlations between the three major subscales, and results suggest that they are associated but also independent. This supports the factor structure of the HDI as a reflection of the three major aspects of mental illness.

HDI Applications
The HDI has both Self Report version for persons 14 through adulthood, and a Parent Report Version allowing children 4-19 to be described by their parents. Both versions have a measured 6th grade reading level. It has multiple applications for improving the mental health treatment of children and adults, including in pediatrics, psychiatry, and primary care medicine. It allows screening for the presence of mental health, behavioral, and addictive disorders, and tracking the outcomes of all types of treatment.

Key Areas Measured

Morale/Distress

Global Symptoms
    Depressive Symptoms
    Anxiety Symptoms
    Attention Problems
    Psychotic Thinking
    Eating Disorders
    Substance Abuse
    Behavioral Problems

Global Impairment
    Occupational/Task Impairment
    Relationship and Social Impairment
    Self-Care Impairment

Background Information
The HDI includes a Background Information section allowing patients to describe their treatment history and health problems, and their family psychiatric and addictive history. This information is only needed at the time of first contact.
Time to complete the Background Questionnaire is approximately 5 minutes. Time to complete the core clinical questionnaire is approximately 8–10 minutes.

Clinician Validation
The HDI has a clinician rating form that allows validation of self-report information. This improves the database for research purposes.

Initial and Subsequent Versions
The HDI was first published in hand-scored versions in 2003.  In 2005, the HDI Version 5 software was released.

This software allows the HDI to be taken on a computer and to be scored automatically, or to have paper versions entered for scoring and compiling of data.  Both graphic and narrative reports are provided to the user by this software. In 2007, a shorter version of the Interpretive Report, the Health Summary Report, was included in the software.

The HDI has been translated into American Spanish. In 2007, the Spanish translation was made available in the software version.

The HDI manual describes the development of the instrument, and its use. Software for administration and scoring runs on Windows-based computers. The software may  be run on servers and made available to work stations. Data is compiled and available for exporting for research and program evaluation.

Reports are available for immediate review by clinicians, and use in therapeutic discussions. HDI results form a foundation for other evidence-based practices.

Availability
The HDI is used in outpatient mental health and primary care settings across the US and Canada, and sold in Great Britain and Australia.

Future Plans
The HDI will be standardized with Spanish speakers. A Parent-Child comparison Report is ready to be integrated into the software. A Treatment Planning module is in preparation. Software graphics updates will be implemented in the next revision. Web-based administration and scoring is available.

Contact information
James V. Wojcik, Ph.D.
Chief Psychologist
Director of Training
Human Services Inc.
7066 Stillwater Blvd. N.
Oakdale, MN 55128
651 251 5078

Stephen Saunders, Ph.D.
Professor of Psychology
Director of Training
Marquette University
Department of Psychology
Cramer Hall 318E
PO box 1881
Milwaukee WI 53201-1881
(414) 288-7459

The following articles concerning the HDI are in preparation by the authors
Alamilla, S.A. Saunders, S., Wojcik, J.V., & Wojcik, H.J.  Factor structure of the HDI. Manuscript in preparation

Pinna, K., Wojcik, J.V., Saunders, S., & Wojcik, H.J. MMPI-2 demoralization and HDI morale scales: Conceptual and concurrent validation. Manuscript in preparation

Wojcik, J.V., Pinna, K.,  Samlaska, K.N., & Sudbeck, N. Phase model prediction of sequential improvement in a day treatment population. Manuscript in preparation

References

Mental disorders screening and assessment tools